Snaith is a market town and parish in the civil parish of Snaith and Cowick in the East Riding of Yorkshire, England. The town is close to the River Aire and the M62 and M18 motorways.

The town's population is 3,176 while the civil parish population is 3,865

History
The name "Snaith" derives from the Old Scandinavian word sneith, meaning "Piece of land cut off". The name was recorded in its modern-day form in  but in the Domesday Book of 1086, it was recorded as Esneid. 

The priory church of St Lawrence is low and wide, with pinnacles. Its core is Norman and cruciform but the tower is Early English and stands at the west end. The chancel is Decorated Gothic and the nave has Perpendicular arcades and a high clerestory. Glass in the chancel window is by Francis Spear and there is a notable monument to Viscount Downe by Francis Chantrey.
The church was designated a Grade I listed building in 1967 and is now recorded in the National Heritage List for England, maintained by Historic England.

Sport
Snaith Juniors Football Club formed in 1990 as Croda F.C. on the grounds of Cowick Hall, then used by Croda International. Snaith Juniors F.C. now play at Ben Bailey housing estate and hold football tournaments at the end of May each year.  The Garth, adjacent to the Methodist Chapel, was given to the people of Snaith for recreation and leisure. The town has an active cycling presence, the Marshes Cycling Club (MCC).

Town centre

Snaith town centre has a variety of amenities and many pubs and restaurants, takeaway and retail shops. The priory church is located on the western side of town and Snaith Hall is directly south of the town. The town also has Methodist church on Cowick Road, a doctor's surgery on Butt Lane, and a fire station on Market Place.

Transport

Snaith railway station has limited daily services to Leeds and Goole. It has no services on Sundays. The town had stations at Snaith and Pollington on the Hull and Barnsley and Great Central Joint Railway and in the nearby village of Carlton, Carlton Towers on the Hull and Barnsley Railway. The town is also served by bus services to Selby and Goole.

References

Snaith
Towns in the East Riding of Yorkshire